Juan Carlos Salgado (born December 20, 1984 in Mexico City, Mexico) is a Mexican professional boxer. He is the former World Boxing Association and International Boxing Federation  Super Featherweight Champion.

Professional career

Juan Carlos won the World Boxing Association Super Featherweight title in sensational fashion by knocking out undefeated Venezuelan star Jorge Linares in the first round. Salgado would lose the title in his first defense to undefeated Japanese fighter Takashi Uchiyama.

Professional boxing record

See also
List of super-featherweight boxing champions
List of Mexican boxing world champions

References

External links

1984 births
Living people
Boxers from Mexico City
Mexican male boxers
Featherweight boxers
Super-featherweight boxers
Lightweight boxers
Light-welterweight boxers
World super-featherweight boxing champions
World Boxing Association champions
International Boxing Federation champions